Happy Man Park is one of the tourist attractions of Mysore city in Karnataka province, India.

Location
The park is located near Kamakshi Hospital at Saraswathipuram, Mysore.

Attractions
The park has little streams and footpaths designed for small children.  There is a special play section for kids.  There is a mini zoo in the park. A small number of birds and rabbits are kept in cages.

The Happy Man Statue
The name of the park is derived from the statue of the man with a pot belly located on the southern corner of the park.  The happy man looks like the smiling Budha.  The garden is well manicured and walking on the grass is not allowed.  The walk remains closed during lunch hours for maintenance.

Image gallery

See also
 Saraswathipuram, Mysore

References

Buildings and structures in Mysore